Fleming Key is an island off the northwest corner of the island of Key West, Florida in the lower Florida Keys.

It is connected to the island of Key West by the Fleming Key Bridge (Mustin Road), having  of clearance over Fleming Key Cut, a small channel.

The island and bridge road are part of a section of the Naval Air Station Key West called Trumbo Point and are inaccessible to civilians without U.S. Navy clearance. The island has a  wastewater treatment plant. It also includes a dolphin research center, marine corrosion testing facility and bunkers where the Navy stores weapons and ammunition.

The bunkers have "explosive safety arcs," or areas that could be blast zones in the case of an accident. Sailing and especially anchoring within those areas is prohibited.

The United States Army Special Forces Underwater Operations Training Center is located at the far northern tip of Fleming Key.

Gallery

References

External links
Aerial color image from Google Maps

Neighborhoods in Key West, Florida
Uninhabited islands of Monroe County, Florida
Islands of the Florida Keys
Islands of Florida